La’auli Montgomery Junior "Monty" Betham (born 12 March 1978) is a professional boxer, and former professional rugby league footballer.

Background
Betham was born in Auckland, New Zealand on 12 March 1978. His father, Samoan-born Monty Betham Sr., had 53 professional fights as a middleweight or light heavyweight from 1973-1982.

Rugby league career
Betham was a Bay Roskill Vikings junior, he was selected to play for Samoa at the 2000 World Cup. On the field Betham was known for his aggressive style of play. He was once voted the player that the opposition players least want to pick a fight with in an NRL players' poll.

Betham missed New Zealand's first ever finals appearance during the 2001 NRL season and the 2002 NRL Grand Final due to injury.  Betham's final game for the club was a 22-20 victory over Manly at Brookvale Oval in round 25 of the 2005 NRL season.  Betham spent one year in England with Wakefield Trinity during the 2006 Super League season.

Highlights 
Junior Club: Papatoetoe & Bay Roskill
First Grade Debut: Round 1, Auckland v Sydney City at Aussie Stadium, 8 March 1999
Career Stats: 101 career games to date scoring 10 tries
Professional Boxing Debut: On 31 March 2006 Monty defeated Vai Toevai via sixth round KO in Apia, Samoa.
Professional Boxing Record - 5-0-0

Boxing career
In December 2006, Betham announced his retirement from rugby league in order to pursue a career in boxing.  Betham will start out in the cruiserweight division and hopes to work his way down to light heavyweight.

His first fight took place in Samoa on 31 March 2007. He defeated 15 fight veteran Vai Toevai in the sixth round.

In 2013, an episode of The X Factor (New Zealand series 1) was filmed at Boxing Alley gym featuring Monty Betham and contestant Whenua Patuwai.

Professional boxing record

| style="text-align:center;" colspan="8"|8 Wins (5 knockouts, 3 decisions), 1 Losses, 0 Draws
|-  style="text-align:center; background:#e3e3e3;"
|  style="border-style:none none solid solid; "|Res.
|  style="border-style:none none solid solid; "|Record
|  style="border-style:none none solid solid; "|Opponent
|  style="border-style:none none solid solid; "|Type
|  style="border-style:none none solid solid; "|Rd., Time
|  style="border-style:none none solid solid; "|Date
|  style="border-style:none none solid solid; "|Location
|  style="border-style:none none solid solid; "|Notes
|- align=center
|Win
|8–1
|align=left| James Langton
|
|
|
|align=left|
|align=left|
|- align=center
|Win
|7–1
|align=left| Adam Hollioake
|
|
|
|align=left|
|align=left|
|- align=center 
|Win
|6–1
|align=left| Carlos Spencer
|
|
|
|align=left|
|align=left|
|- align=center
|Loss
|5–1
|align=left| Shane Cameron
|
|
|
|align=left|
|align=left|
|- align=center
|Win
|5–0
|align=left| James Chan
|
|
|
|align=left|
|align=left|
|- align=center
|Win
|4–0
|align=left| Frank Asiata
|
|
|
|align=left|
|align=left|
|- align=center 
|Win
|3–0
|align=left| Aaron Bartlett
|
|
|
|align=left|
|align=left|
|- align=center 
|Win
|2–0
|align=left| Trevor Loomes
|
|
|
|align=left|
|align=left|
|- align=center
|Win
|1–0
|align=left| Vai Toevai
|
|
|
|align=left|
|align=left|
|}

Title
Regional/International Titles:
NZNBF Cruiserweight Champion (197 lbs)
Samoa Cruiserweight Champion (196 lbs)

Television
Betham was runner-up on Season 4 of New Zealand Dancing With The Stars in 2008.
Betham is trained by Danny Codling and managed by Mick Watson.
In 2007 Betham competed in New Zealand reality show Treasure Island:Pirates of the Pacific. In March 2008 he competed on New Zealand Celebrity Joker Poker, he made it to the final three on the final episode before being eliminated (Shortland Street actor Craig Parker was the overall winner).

Dancing with the Stars (New Zealand, Season 4)
In December 2007 it was announced that Betham would compete in season 4 of Dancing with the Stars which started in February 2008. On January 28, 2008 it was revealed on The Edge (radio station) that Betham's professional dance partner would be Nerida Jantti (girlfriend of Shane Cortese). On April 15, 2008 he was named runner-up (Temepara George being the overall winner).

Filmography
Treasure Island: Pirates of the Pacific (2007)
Dancing With The Stars (Season 4, 2008)
Celebrity Joker Poker (16–30 March 2008)

The Shopping Channel
In October 2012 Betham became one of the inaugural TV presenters on The Shopping Channel (New Zealand), New Zealand's first and only home shopping channel.

Monty Betham's Steps for Life Foundation
With his sister Chante Betham-Spencer (CEO) he founded Monty Betham's Steps for Life Foundation in 2010 to "Help NZ youth and families in the fight against childhood obesity in NZ".

Personal life
After returning home from competing on Treasure Island, Betham and his wife Jaymie celebrated the birth of their first child, a son. Betham's wife is currently expecting their second child.

References

Further reading

External links
Monty Betham Official Player Profile
Monty Betham NRL Player Profile

Monty Betham Official Website
Monty Betham's Steps for Life Foundation
Boxing Alley Website

1978 births
Living people
Bay Roskill Vikings players
Boxers from Auckland
Fighters trained by Lolo Heimuli
Junior Kiwis players
New Zealand male boxers
New Zealand national rugby league team players
New Zealand sportspeople of Samoan descent
New Zealand professional boxing champions
New Zealand rugby league players
New Zealand Warriors captains
New Zealand Warriors players
People educated at Marcellin College, Auckland
Point Chevalier Pirates players
Rugby league hookers
Rugby league locks
Rugby league players from Auckland
Rugby league second-rows
Samoa national rugby league team players
Wakefield Trinity captains
Wakefield Trinity players